The 2006 Speedway Conference League was the third tier/division of British speedway.

Summary
The title was won by Scunthorpe Scorpions who won the playoffs.

Final league table

Play-offs

Conference League Knockout Cup
The 2006 Conference League Knockout Cup was the ninth edition of the Knockout Cup for tier three teams. Scunthorpe Scorpions were the winners.

First round

Semi-finals

Final

Other Honours
Conference Trophy - Scunthorpe 110 Plymouth 75
Conference league pairs - 1st Scunthorpe 'B'; 2nd Stoke
Conference league fours - Stoke 16+, Plymouth 16, Mildenhall 10, Scunthorpe 6
Conference League Riders' Championship - Adam Roynon (Buxton)
+ won run off

See also
List of United Kingdom Speedway League Champions

References

Conference
Speedway Conference League